Fauna of the Isle of Man may refer to:
 Biota of the Isle of Man
 List of birds of the Isle of Man

See also
 Outline of the Isle of Man

References

Fauna of the Isle of Man